The School and College Ability Test (SCAT), is a standardized test conducted in the United States that measures math and verbal reasoning abilities in gifted children.

About
The SCAT is used by the Center for Talented Youth (CTY) as an above-grade-level entrance exam for students in grades 2–8.  Students in grades 2-3 take the Elementary SCAT designed for students in grades 4-5. Students in grades 4-5 take the Intermediate SCAT designed for students in grades 6-8. Students in grades 6 and above take the Advanced SCAT designed for students in grades 9-12.  There are 55 questions per section, 5 of which are experimental. The percentile ranks for the SCAT have not been updated since 1979. So, when your child takes this test, your child is being compared to a national sample of children who took the test in 1979.

The equivalent test in the UK is the CAT4 test run by GL Assessment and consists of a battery of 4 individual tests; Verbal Reasoning, Non-Verbal Reasoning, Spatial Reasoning, Quantitative Reasoning. CAT4 is used as an admission test and also by schools to determine potential (gifted or weaker children).

Qualification
Anyone who pays for the test may take it; there are no requirements for testing.

Scoring
Scoring is based on a three-step process in which a child's raw score is scaled based on the test version and then compared to the results of the test scores of normal students in the higher-level grade. Please keep in mind that the group of normal students took this test in 1979. So, your child's percentile ranks could be different if compared to a more recent group of test takers.
 The minimum scores required for qualification for the 2nd to 10th grade CTY summer courses are below:          
Grade 2 ≥ 430 SCAT Verbal or 435 SCAT Quantitative
Grade 3 ≥ 435 SCAT Verbal or 440 SCAT Quantitative
Grade 4 ≥ 440 SCAT Verbal or 450 SCAT Quantitative
Grade 5 ≥ 445 SCAT Verbal or 465 SCAT Quantitative
Grade 6 ≥ 450 SCAT Verbal or 470 SCAT Quantitative
Grade 7 ≥ 455 SCAT Verbal or 475 SCAT Quantitative
Grade 8 ≥ 460 SCAT Verbal or 480 SCAT Quantitative
Grade 9 ≥ 465 SCAT Verbal or 485 SCAT Quantitative
Grade 10 ≥ 470 SCAT Verbal or 490 SCAT Quantitative

References

External links
Catalog Of Summer Programs For Grades 2–6
GL Assessment CAT4 Tests
CAT4 Questions Answered

Gifted education